Judy Goodrich (born 5 May 1963) is a Canadian retired Paralympic athlete. She competed in javelin, swimming, and wheelchair basketball.

References

Living people
1963 births
Medalists at the 1984 Summer Paralympics
Medalists at the 1988 Summer Paralympics
Paralympic medalists in swimming
Paralympic medalists in athletics (track and field)
Paralympic medalists in wheelchair basketball
Paralympic gold medalists for Canada
Paralympic silver medalists for Canada
Paralympic bronze medalists for Canada
Wheelchair basketball players at the 1992 Summer Paralympics
Medalists at the 1992 Summer Paralympics
Swimmers at the 1984 Summer Paralympics
Swimmers at the 1988 Summer Paralympics
Swimmers from Calgary
Paralympic wheelchair basketball players of Canada
Canadian female freestyle swimmers
Canadian female backstroke swimmers
Canadian female javelin throwers